Liuhuang may refer to:

Liuhuang, Guangdong (留隍), a town in Fengshun County, Guangdong, China
Liuhuang Township (柳黄乡), a township in Wanyuan, Sichuan, China
Liuhuang Expressway